Alexander Falk (born May 24, 1993) is a Swedish professional ice hockey defenceman. He is currently playing with Djurgårdens IF of the HockeyAllsvenskan (Allsv).

Falk made his Elitserien debut playing with Djurgårdens during the 2011–12 Elitserien season.

References

External links

1993 births
Living people
Djurgårdens IF Hockey players
Södertälje SK players
Ice hockey people from Stockholm
Swedish ice hockey defencemen
Timrå IK players
HC Vita Hästen players